Jesus Christ ( AD 30 or 33) was a Jewish preacher and religious leader who most Christians believe to be the incarnation of God and Muslims believe to have been a prophet.

Jesus Christ or Jesus the Christ may also refer to:
 Jesus Christ (Internet personality) (born 1980 or 1981), American actor and vlogger
 "Jesus Christ" (Longpigs song), 1996 song by Longpigs
 "Jesus Christ" (Woody Guthrie song)
 Jesus H. Christ, a common interjection
 Jesus the Christ (book), 1915 doctrinal study by James E. Talmage

See also 
 Jesus Christ Allin or GG Allin (1956–1993), American punk rock musician
 Christ (title), the Greek title for Messiah, applied to Jesus for his role as the Jewish Messiah in Christianity
 Jesus (disambiguation)